Timy Yudhani Rahayu (born 11 December 1976) is an Indonesian beach volleyball player. She competed in the women's tournament at the 1996 Summer Olympics.

References

1976 births
Living people
Indonesian women's beach volleyball players
Olympic beach volleyball players of Indonesia
Beach volleyball players at the 1996 Summer Olympics
Place of birth missing (living people)
Beach volleyball players at the 2002 Asian Games
Asian Games competitors for Indonesia
20th-century Indonesian women